Leandro Barsotti (born 23 July 1963 in Brindisi, Italy) is an Italian singer-songwriter.
His first big break came at the 1996 the Sanremo Music Festival with his song "Lasciarsi amare".
In 1997, Barsotti took part for the second time in the Sanremo Music Festival, performing the song "Fragolina".

Discography

 1991 – Il caso Barsotti
 1992 – Ho la vita che mi brucia gli occhi
 1994 – Vitamina
 1996 – Bella vita
 1997 – Fragolina collection
 2000 – Il segno di Elia
 2007 – Il jazz nel burrone

Duets

 With David Buzzi: La borsa degli scudi

1963 births
Living people
Italian male singer-songwriters
Italian singer-songwriters
People from Brindisi